TranGO, also known as the Okanogan County Transit Authority (OCTA), is a public transit agency that provides bus service in Okanogan County, Washington.

History

TranGO was approved by voters on November 5, 2013, and began operation on its 3 routes serving the cities of Omak and Okanogan with a month of free service on July 1, 2015. It is funded by 0.4% sales tax applied within the public transportation benefit area, which accounts for $175,000 in monthly revenue.

Service

, TranGO operates eight routes serving communities in Okanogan County, including Okanogan, Omak, Tonasket, Twisp, Oroville, Winthrop, Pateros, and Brewster.

Fleet

, TranGO operates a fleet of eight minibuses that run on gasoline.

See also
Okanogan County Transportation & Nutrition

References

External links

Bus transportation in Washington (state)
Transportation in Okanogan County, Washington